Alice Merner Agogino (born 1952) is an American mechanical engineer known for her work in bringing women and people of color into engineering and her research into artificial intelligence, computer-aided design, intelligent learning systems, and wireless sensor networks.

In 1997, Agogino was elected as a member to the National Academy of Engineering for applications of artificial intelligence and for reform efforts in engineering education.

Early life and education 
Agogino attended the University of New Mexico for her undergraduate education, and earned her bachelor's degree in mechanical engineering in 1975. She earned her master's degree three years later from the University of California, Berkeley. Her doctoral work concerned engineering and economic systems and was conducted at Stanford University. She earned her Ph.D there in 1984.

Career and research 
Agogino began her career while still an undergraduate with a stint as a project engineer for Dow Chemical from 1972–1973. While working on her master's degree and during the first year of her doctoral studies, she was a mechanical engineer and systems specialist at General Electric. She founded her own company in 1979, Agogino Engineering, which still exists. In 1980, Agogino spent a year as a systems analyst for SRI. From 1980–1981 she led the Santa Clara University's Women in Engineering program. Agogino was made an assistant professor in mechanical engineering at the University of California, Berkeley in 1984; she is now the university's Roscoe and Elizabeth Hughes Professor of Mechanical Engineering.

From 1995–1999 she was the associate dean of Berkeley's College of Engineering, and from 1999–2001 she was the director of its Instructional Technology Program. She has been funded by the National Science Foundation to work with Synthesis, a program that encourages engineering education at the undergraduate level. She has served on professional committees for the National Science Foundation, the National Research Council, and the National Academy of Engineering. Her current research is focused on sustainable technology and AI/Robotics for Good. In 2017, she co-founded Squishy Robotics, Inc. and serves as CEO.

Honors and awards 
Agogino is a fellow of several scientific societies, including the National Academy of Engineering (1997), the American Association for the Advancement of Science, the European Academy of Science, the Association of Women in Science, and the American Society of Mechanical Engineers. She is a member of the Society of Women Engineers and the Institute of Electrical and Electronics Engineers.

She has also received a number of awards:
 Presidential Young Investigator Award, NSF (1985)
 Young Manufacturing Engineer of the Year, Society of Manufacturing Engineers (1987)
 Director's Award for Distinguished Teaching Scholars, NSF (2004)
 Chancellor's Award for Advancing Institutional Excellence, Berkeley (2006)
 Professor of the Year, Pi Tau Sigma Berkeley (2011)
 Lifetime Mentoring Award, AAAS (2012–2013)
 Presidential Award for Excellence in Science, Mathematics & Engineering Mentoring (2018)
 2020 Athena Award for Academic Leadership. The award was presented on March 6, 2020 at the Reimagining Cybersecurity for All Symposium in Berkeley.

External links 
 Agogino's curriculum vitae
 Agogino's Education & Employment

1952 births
Living people
American mechanical engineers
American roboticists
Women roboticists
American women engineers
20th-century American women scientists
21st-century American women scientists
20th-century American engineers
21st-century American engineers
20th-century women engineers
21st-century women engineers
Engineers from New Mexico
University of New Mexico alumni
UC Berkeley College of Engineering alumni
UC Berkeley College of Engineering faculty